In enzymology, a limonoid glucosyltransferase is an enzyme that catalyzes the chemical reaction

UDP-glucose + limonin  glucosyl-limonin + UDP

Thus, the two substrates of this enzyme are UDP-glucose and limonin, whereas its two products are glucosyl-limonin and UDP.

This enzyme belongs to the family of glycosyltransferases, specifically the hexosyltransferases.  The systematic name of this enzyme class is uridine diphosphoglucose-limonoid glucosyltransferase.

References

 

EC 2.4.1
Enzymes of unknown structure